Melvin "Duke" Markham, born Melvin Nesbit (December 14, 1906 – January 29, 1939), was an American baseball outfielder in the Negro leagues. He played with the Newark Dodgers/Eagles in 1935  and 1936. Markham was shot and killed in Winston-Salem, North Carolina in 1939.

References

External links
 and Seamheads

Newark Dodgers players
Newark Eagles players
1906 births
1939 deaths
Baseball players from South Carolina
Baseball outfielders
20th-century African-American sportspeople
Deaths by firearm in North Carolina